Elizabeth Chávez (born 20 March 1972) is a Honduran sprinter. She competed in the women's 100 metres at the 1996 Summer Olympics.

References

External links
 

1972 births
Living people
Athletes (track and field) at the 1996 Summer Olympics
Honduran female sprinters
Olympic athletes of Honduras
Place of birth missing (living people)
Central American Games silver medalists for Honduras
Central American Games bronze medalists for Honduras
Central American Games medalists in athletics
Olympic female sprinters